Maborosi, known in Japan as , is a 1995 Japanese drama film by director Hirokazu Kore-eda starring Makiko Esumi, Tadanobu Asano, and Takashi Naito. It is based on a novel by Teru Miyamoto.

The film won a Golden Osella Award for Best Cinematography at the 1995 Venice Film Festival.

Plot
Yumiko (Esumi) and Ikuo (Asano) are a young Osaka couple who have a new baby. One day Ikuo is walking along the railway tracks and is hit and killed by a train. It seems that he may have done this deliberately yet there is no apparent motive. A few years pass. Yumiko agrees to an arranged marriage with a widower, Tamio (Naitō), and she and Yuichi (her son, now played by Gohki Kashima) move to Tamio's house in a rustic village on the Sea of Japan coast, shot on location in Wajima, on the Noto Peninsula (the actual location where the film was shot is Uniumachi, about 5 km west from Wajima along the coast).

A drunken spat over a bell Yumiko had given Ikuo just before he died causes Yumiko and Tamio to discuss their strong emotions for their lost loves. Shortly after, Yumiko follows a funeral procession and lingers at the crematorium, until Tamio arrives by car to pick her up, at which point she says she just wants to know why Ikuo killed himself. Tamio suggests that, like the will o' the wisps his father used to see, perhaps something just drew him away from life.

Critical reception
On Metacritic, the film is ranked 92 out of a 100, based on 8 reviews. Critic Roger Ebert praised the film, noting its "astonishing beauty and sadness" and the influence of Japanese filmmaker Yasujiro Ozu.

See also
List of films with a 100% rating on Rotten Tomatoes, a film review aggregator website

References

Bibliography

External links

 (2016, 2019 reissues)

1995 films
1995 drama films
1990s Japanese-language films
Japanese drama films
Films directed by Hirokazu Kore-eda
Films about suicide
Films set in Ishikawa Prefecture
1990s Japanese films